A codon table can be used to translate a genetic code into a sequence of amino acids. The standard genetic code is traditionally represented as an RNA codon table, because when proteins are made in a cell by ribosomes, it is messenger RNA (mRNA) that directs protein synthesis. The mRNA sequence is determined by the sequence of genomic DNA. In this context, the standard genetic code is referred to as translation table 1. It can also be represented in a DNA codon table. The DNA codons in such tables occur on the sense DNA strand and are arranged in a 5′-to-3′ direction. Different tables with alternate codons are used depending on the source of the genetic code, such as from a cell nucleus, mitochondrion, plastid, or hydrogenosome.

There are 64 different codons in the genetic code and the below tables; most specify an amino acid. Three sequences, UAG, UGA, and UAA, known as stop codons, do not code for an amino acid but instead signal the release of the nascent polypeptide from the ribosome. In the standard code, the sequence AUG—read as methionine—can serve as a start codon and, along with sequences such as an initiation factor, initiates translation. In rare instances, start codons in the standard code may also include GUG or UUG; these codons normally represent valine and leucine, respectively, but as start codons they are translated as methionine or formylmethionine.

The first table—the standard table—can be used to translate nucleotide triplets into the corresponding amino acid or appropriate signal if it is a start or stop codon. The second table, appropriately called the inverse, does the opposite: it can be used to deduce a possible triplet code if the amino acid is known. As multiple codons can code for the same amino acid, the International Union of Pure and Applied Chemistry's (IUPAC) nucleic acid notation is given in some instances.

Translation table 1

Standard RNA codon table

Inverse RNA codon table

Standard DNA codon table

Inverse DNA codon table

Alternative codons in other translation tables

The genetic code was once believed to be universal: a codon would code for the same amino acid regardless of the organism or source. However, it is now agreed that the genetic code evolves, resulting in discrepancies in how a codon is translated depending on the genetic source. For example, in 1981, it was discovered that the use of codons AUA, UGA, AGA and AGG by the coding system in mammalian mitochondria differed from the universal code. Stop codons can also be affected: in ciliated protozoa, the universal stop codons UAA and UAG code for glutamine. The following table displays these alternative codons.

See also

 Bioinformatics
 List of genetic codes

Notes

References

Further reading

External links
 DNA codon chart organized in a wheel

Gene expression
Molecular genetics
Protein biosynthesis
Bioinformatics